The intellectual dark web (IDW) is a label which has been applied to some commentators who oppose identity politics, political correctness, and cancel culture in higher education and the news media within Western countries.

Individuals and publications associated with the term reject what they view as authoritarianism and ostracism within mainstream progressive movements in Western countries, especially within universities and the news media. This includes opposition to deplatforming, boycotts, and online shaming, which are seen as threats to freedom of speech. Those who have been labelled as being part of the IDW come from both the right and left of the political spectrum. The validity of the term is contested by some it has been applied to due to the range of beliefs it encompasses.

Definition
Sources differ on the nature of the IDW, with some describing its members as "small-l liberals" and others as "reactionaries" and ideologically diverse. Shared beliefs include opposition to political correctness, but focus areas vary. Those who have been linked to the IDW are generally critical of what they perceive as "conformist" liberals, and some have been associated with the alt-lite and the alt-right of the political spectrum. Writers for Psychology Today characterized it as "generally concerned about political tribalism and free speech", or as a rejection of "mainstream assumptions about what is true". Writers for Salon dubbed it a politically conservative movement united more over a rejection of American liberalism than over any mutually shared beliefs. Alternatively, Christian Alejandro Gonzalez, writing for the National Review, posited that, despite comprising "all political persuasions", the IDW was united in a particular conservative-leaning conceptualization of injustice and inequality specifically. 

In his book Against the Web: A Cosmopolitan Answer to the New Right, author and political commentator Michael Brooks lists a "devotion to affirming capitalism", a "shared obsession with campus and social media controversies" and an "intense interest in IQ and other innate justifications for systemic inequalities" as defining features of the group.

Origin and usage

Eric Weinstein, mathematician and former director of Thiel Capital, stated that when he coined the term he was "half-joking". This occurred after Weinstein's brother, biologist Bret Weinstein, resigned in 2017 from his position as professor of biology at the Evergreen State College in response to protests against his criticism of a campus event that asked white students to stay off campus, as opposed to the previous annual tradition of black students voluntarily absenting themselves. The website Big Think has argued that other controversies, dating back to 2014, should also be viewed as antecedents to the IDW. These include a debate between Sam Harris and Ben Affleck on Real Time with Bill Maher in October 2014, the publication of "Google's Ideological Echo Chamber" by James Damore in August 2017, and Cathy Newman's interview of Jordan Peterson on Channel 4 News in January 2018, each of which related to controversial topics such as Islamic extremism and workplace diversity policies.

The term gained traction after a May 2018 opinion piece by then staff editor Bari Weiss in The New York Times titled "Meet the Renegades of the Intellectual Dark Web". Weiss characterized individuals she named as associated with the intellectual dark web as "iconoclastic thinkers, academic renegades and media personalities", who have been "purged from institutions that have become increasingly hostile to unorthodox thought", and who have instead taken to social media, podcasting, public speaking, and other alternative venues outside "legacy media". Weiss stated "the Intellectual Dark Web [is] a term coined half-jokingly by Mr. Weinstein".

Reception
Weiss's article sparked a number of critiques. Jonah Goldberg, writing in the National Review, said the "label is a bit overwrought", writing that it struck him "as a marketing label – and not necessarily a good one. ... It seems to me this IDW thing isn't actually an intellectual movement. It's just a coalition of thinkers and journalists who happen to share a disdain for the keepers of the liberal orthodoxy." Henry Farrell, writing in Vox, expressed disbelief that conservative commentator Ben Shapiro or neuroscientist Sam Harris, both claimed to be among the intellectual dark web by Weiss, could credibly be described as either purged or silenced. Weiss' fellow New York Times columnist Paul Krugman noted the irony of claiming popular intellectual oppression by the mainstream, while publishing in the Times, among the most prominent newspapers in the nation, although Weiss did not herself claim to be part of the IDW and would depart The Times almost exactly one year later over the same issues central to figures in it. David French contended many of the critics were missing the point, and were instead inadvertently confirming "the need for a movement of intellectual free-thinkers."

In 2019, a study from the Federal University of Minas Gerais found a pattern of migration of viewers who comment on YouTube videos, from commenting on clips associated with the IDW and the "alt-lite" to commenting on more algorithm-defined "right-wing and/or alt-right" videos. The study looked at over 331,000 videos that an algorithm had classified as right-wing, analyzed 79 million YouTube comments, and found a group that migrated from IDW channels to "alt-lite" channels, and then the alt-right channels. The subjects who left comments at an IDW channel were more likely to graduate after a few years to leaving significantly more comments on alt-right channels than the control group. The study's authors said they were not intending to "point fingers", but to draw attention to the effects of YouTube's recommendation algorithm, calling it an "almost totally algorithm-driven process."

Associated individuals
In a New York Times editorial, Bari Weiss listed individuals associated with the intellectual dark web, including Ayaan Hirsi Ali, Sam Harris, Heather Heying, Claire Lehmann, Douglas Murray, Maajid Nawaz, Jordan Peterson, Steven Pinker, Joe Rogan, Dave Rubin, Ben Shapiro, Michael Shermer, Christina Hoff Sommers, Bret Weinstein, and Eric Weinstein.

Although those associated with the IDW primarily criticize the political left, some describe themselves as liberal, but criticize what they perceive as the excesses and insouciance of the American left, while others lean to the right. Nick Fouriezos of Ozy magazine describes IDW as "a growing school of thought that includes a collection of mostly left-leaning professors, pundits and thinkers united in their criticism of the modern social justice movement as authoritarian and illogical." Liberals who have been labelled as being part of the IDW often credit the Enlightenment with vast improvements in human welfare since the 18th century, and see Enlightenment values such as freedom of speech and individual rights as threatened by both political correctness on the left, and Trumpism and religious conservatism on the right. Criticism of the IDW has come primarily from the left and support from the right. The Guardian characterized the IDW as "strange bedfellows" that comprise the "supposed thinking wing of the alt-right". The Los Angeles Review of Books described the members as identifying with both the left and the right, but united against "primary adversaries" including political correctness, progressives, left-wing politics, and "the neo-fascist alt-right".

The characterization of it being an alt-right group (for example, in The Guardian) has been rejected by members of the IDW.

Regarding the organization of the IDW, Daniel W. Drezner observed that it is essentially leaderless, and may be individually beholden to their audiences, unable to progress a coherent agenda. Some writers, including Cathy Young, have expressed uncertainty over whether they belong in the intellectual dark web. For her part, historian of medicine and science Alice Dreger expressed surprise in being told she was a member of the IDW at all. After she was invited to be profiled in the New York Times article, she stated that she "had no idea who half the people in this special network were. The few Intellectual Dark Web folks I had met I didn't know very well. How could I be part of a powerful intellectual alliance when I didn't even know these people?"

In November 2020, Harris distanced himself from the movement, saying that he was "turn[ing] in [his] imaginary membership card to this imaginary organization", because some unidentified members of the group were propagating President Donald Trump's claims that the 2020 US presidential election was stolen through massive voter fraud.

See also
 Culture war
 Heterodox Academy

References

2010s neologisms
American political neologisms
Anti-communism
Anti-Marxism
Criticism of postmodernism
Identity politics
Political philosophy